Tomasa Tequiero is a Venezuelan telenovela written by Doris Seguí and produced by Venevisión between 2009 and 2010. On October 7, 2009, Venevisión began broadcasting Tomasa tequiero at 9:00 pm, replacing Un Esposo para Estela.

Gledys Ibarra stars as the main protagonist, accompanied by Carlos Montilla, Carlos Cruz, María Antonieta Duque and Emma Rabbe.

Plot
For most of her adult life, Tomasa has served the Paredes family, and she has been a cheerful, good-hearted servant towards them. Her only son, Ramón, works in Colombia. Tomasa has practically raised up the two daughters of the Paredes family, Fabiana and Miguelina, as if they are her own. Tomasa is satisfied with her simple, uncomplicated life, and she couldn't wish for more. But soon, her life is going to be turned upside down due to several events. First, her son Ramón will return from Colombia to stay in Caracas. Secondly, her employers, the Paredes, are involved in an airplane accident, and she discovers that she is the sole beneficiary of their life insurance policy worth two million dollars. Tomasa will be transformed from a simple maid to a millionaire.

However, not everything will go smoothly for Tomasa, as people will begin to view her differently once they discover that she has a lot of money. Tomasa will now have to stand by her strong principles and watch over her family and protect them from the greed of others. Her life becomes even more complicated with the introduction of Severo Bustamante, a romantic love interest who is in debt and will try to get close to Tomasa in order to obtain some of her money. Severo is a relative of the Paderes, and his compulsive gambling habits have led to his unstable financial situation. Moreover, Severo will attempt to conquer Tomasa, but he is married to Virginia who is a model of a perfect housewife. Virginia will become one of Tomasa's enemies after discovering that her husband is about to leave her in order to pursue a relationship with Tomasa. Antonio, Severo's brother will also enter Tomasa's life. At first doubtful as to why the Paredes left their money to a maid, he soon discovers that family and love are what is important – especially to Tomasa. However, their potential love will be ruined by the return of Roxana, Severo's ex-wife who abandoned him and their seven-year-old son in order to run away with her lover.

Cast

Main Cast
 Gledys Ibarra as Tomasa Tequiero Montiel
 Carlos Montilla as Severo Bustamante
 Nohely Arteaga as Virginia de Bustamante
 Carlos Cruz as Antonio Bustamante
 Maria Antonieta Duque as Roxana
 Emma Rabbe as Emilia Ferrara

Also as Main
 Laureano Olivares as Ramón Tequiero Jaramillo Montiel
 Elaiza Gil as Margarita Paredes
 Rafael Romero as Agustín 
 Daniela Navarro as Fabiana Paredes Bustamante
 Abril Schreiber as Miguelina Paredes Bustamante
 Rolando Padilla as Jorman de Jesús 
 Beatriz Vásquez as Floritex Carrera
 Cesar Román as Oswaldo Bustamante 
 Jose Manuel Suárez as Jorge Bustamante 
 Patricia Schwarzgruber as Sofía Arango
 Alejandro Mata as Don Pedro

Supporting Cast
 Loly Sánchez as Martirio Paredes
 Carmen Julia Álvarez as Pascualina
 Roberto Lamarca as Perucho
 Fernándo Villate as Cariaquito 
 Adriana Romero as Blondinet 
 Jose Luis Useche as Perfecto 
 Sindy Lazo as Susana 
 Rosmel Bustamante as Francisco "Chicho" Bustamante
 Claudio De La Torre as Francisco Hurtado
 Pedro Pablo Porras as Rudelio 
 Marco Antonio Alcalá as Bobby Jabón
 Vanessa Di Quattro as Darling Guadalupe 
 Janset Rojas as Verónica
 Susy Herrera as Sara 
 Virginia Lancaster as Yamilca  
 Sonia Villamizar as Katiuska Bustamante de Paredes
 Henry Soto as Rómulo Paredes
 Ligia Duarte as Greta
 Rodolfo Drago as Marlon
 Moisés Berroterán as Exenobel
 Rhandy Piñango as Augusto

References

External links

2009 telenovelas
Venevisión telenovelas
2009 Venezuelan television series debuts
2010 Venezuelan television series endings
Venezuelan telenovelas
Spanish-language telenovelas
Television shows set in Caracas